Mežciems (“forest village” in Latvian) is a Latvian place name that may refer to:

Places 

 Mežciems, Daugavpils, a neighbourhood of Daugavpils
 Mežciems, Riga, a neighbourhood of Riga
 Mežciems, Ape municipality, a settlement in Ape municipality
 Mežciems, Carnikava municipality, a settlement in Carnikava municipality
 Mežciems, Jelgava municipality, a settlement in Jelgava municipality
 Mežciems, Bracebridge, Ontario, a cottage community in Bracebridge, Ontario

Other uses 
 Mežciems Station, a railway station in Daugavpils
 Mežciems massacres, part of the Holocaust in Latvia